Anju is the Romanized form of several given names of unrelated origin. In Indic languages, Anju is a diminutive form of the female given names Anjali and Anjana. In Japanese,  is a female given name meaning 'apricot tree'.

 Anju (actress), Indian actress in Malayalam and Tamil films
 Anju Aravind, Indian actress in Malayalam, Tamil, and Telugu films
 Anju Bala (born 1979), Indian politician
 Anju Bhargava, American management consultant and advisor to Barack Obama
 Anju Bobby George (born 1977), Indian long-jumper
 Anju Chadha, Indian biochemist
 Anju Chaudhuri (born 1944), Bengali-French artist
 Anju Dhillon, Canadian politician
 Anju Ghosh, Bangladeshi film actress
 Anju Inami (born 1996), Japanese voice actress
 Anju Jain (born 1974), Indian cricketer
 Anju Joseph (born 1990), Malayali singer
 Anju Kurian, Indian film actress
 Anju Mahendru (born 1946), Indian actress in Hindi shows
 Anju Makhija, Indian poet, playwright, and translator
 Anju Panta (born 1977), Nepali singer
 Anju Suzuki (born 1969), Japanese actress, known professionally as Kakko or Kakuko Yamagata

Feminine given names